Colosio: El asesinato is a 2012 Mexican thriller film directed by Carlos Bolado.

It examines the events leading to the assassination of Mexican presidential candidate Luis Donaldo Colosio, of the PRI party at a campaign rally in Tijuana during the Mexican presidential campaign of 1994.

Cast 
 José María Yazpik as Andrés Vázquez
 Daniel Giménez Cacho as José María Córdoba Montoya
 Kate del Castillo as Verónica
 Odiseo Bichir as José Francisco Ruiz Massieu
 Tenoch Huerta Mejía as Jesús 'Chuy'
 Harold Torres as Mario Aburto Martínez / Joel López 'La Ballena' / Juan Manuel Sánchez Ortiz

References

External links 

2012 thriller films
2012 films
Mexican thriller films
2010s Mexican films